DJ-Kicks: John Talabot is a DJ mix album released on the Studio !K7 independent record label.  Part of the DJ-Kicks series of mix compilations, it is the 46th installment of the series and was compiled and mixed by John Talabot.

Track listing
 North Lake - "Journey To The Center Of The Sun"
 Pye Corner Audio - "Underneath The Dancefloor"
 Maps - "I Heard Them Say (Andy Stott Remix)"
 Pye Corner Audio - "Zero Centre"
 Michael Ozone - "Hetrotopia (Young Marco Remix)"
 Madteo - "We Doubt (You Can Make It)"
 Harmonious Thelonious - "The Grasshopper Was The Witness (Elmore Judd & Rowan Park Remix)"
 Tempel Rytmik - "Anagrama"
 John Talabot - "Without You (DJ-Kicks)"
 Axel Boman - "Klinsmann"
 Joaquin Joe Claussell presents Residue Part One - "Eno (Melodic Dub)"
 Bostro Pesopeo & Pional - "Bonus Beats"
 Mara TK - "Run (Moodymann Remix)"
 Alex Burkat - "Shower Scene"
 Mistakes are Okay - "Night Watcher"
 Unknown - "#001"
 Round - "Glass"
 Max Mohr - "Old Song"
 Samo DJ - "Tai Po Kau"
 Motor City Drum Ensemble - "Escape To Nowhere"
 Paradise's Deep Groove - "Innermind"
 Abby - "Streets (Wraetlic Remix)"
 DJ Jus-Ed - "Turn Of The Century"
 Genius of Time - "Juno Jam"
 Kron - "Silikron (Jürgen Paape Remix)"
 Talaboman - "Sideral"
 Pional - "It's All Over (Locked Groove Rendition)"

References

DJ-Kicks albums
2013 compilation albums